Ramella is an Italian surname. Notable people with the surname include:

Elvina Ramella (1927–2007), Italian operatic soprano
Ernestino Ramella (born 1955), Italian footballer and manager
Fabio Ramella, Swiss sport shooter
Luciano Ramella (1914–1990), Italian footballer

Italian-language surnames